Raivio is a Finnish surname. Notable people with the surname include:

 Derek Raivio (born 1984), American basketball player
 Matti Raivio (1893–1957), Finnish cross country skier
Rick Raivio, American basketball player

See also
 Raivis

Finnish-language surnames